Daniel Adler (born April 16, 1958) is a Brazilian sailor.  He is Jewish. His father Harry Adler and brother Alan Adler were also sailing Olympians.

Adler won a silver medal for Brazil at the 1984 Olympics in Los Angeles in yachting (Soling), with Torben Grael and Ronaldo Senfft.  He also competed in the 1988 Olympics in Seoul (coming in 5th) where he sailed in Race 1 to 5 before being replaced by Christoph Bergman due to illness and the 1992 Olympics in Barcelona (coming in 13th).

He is the brother of Olympian Alan Adler, who competed for Brazil in the 1984, 1988, and 1992 Olympics in the Mixed Two-Person Heavyweight Dinghy, and the son of Harry Adler, who was in the 1964 Olympics.  His niece is Brazilian Girl’s 29er Daniela Adler Pimentel Duarte.

See also
 List of select Jews in sailing
 List of Olympic medalists in sailing

References

External links
 
 
 

Living people
1958 births
20th-century Brazilian Jews
Brazilian male sailors (sport)
Jewish sailors (sport)
Medalists at the 1984 Summer Olympics
North American Champions Soling
Olympic medalists in sailing
Olympic sailors of Brazil
Olympic silver medalists for Brazil
Sailors at the 1984 Summer Olympics – Soling
Sailors at the 1988 Summer Olympics – Soling
Sailors at the 1992 Summer Olympics – Soling
South American Champions Soling